Savar Kalateh (also Romanized as Sāvar Kalāteh) is a village in Katul Rural District, in the Central District of Aliabad County, Golestan Province, Iran. At the 2006 census, its population was 450, in 113 families.

References 

Populated places in Aliabad County